Raimundo Barneda Domingo (born December 3, 1968, in Vilanova i la Geltrú, Spain) is a retired basketball player.

Clubs
1988-90: Bàsquet Manresa
1990-93: Ourense Baloncesto
1993-94: CB Peñas Huesca

References
ACB profile

1968 births
Living people
Spanish men's basketball players
Basketball players from Catalonia
Liga ACB players
Bàsquet Manresa players
Small forwards
People from Vilanova i la Geltrú
Sportspeople from the Province of Barcelona
Club Ourense Baloncesto players
CB Peñas Huesca players